David Farr may refer to:

David Farr (businessman), American businessman
David Farr (theatre director), British writer and director